KZYM (1230 AM) is an American radio station broadcasting from Joplin, Missouri.

Programming 
AM 1230 The Talker features:  Rick and Bubba In The Morning, Laura Ingraham, Dr. Laura, Dave Ramsey, Dennis Miller, John Gibson, Phil Hendrie, At Home with Gary Sullivan, Real Estate Today, Leo Laporte, Bob Brinker Money Talk, and Free Talk Live.

KZYM also features news from SRN (Salem Radio Network) at the top and bottom of the hour.  Salem provides national news with a Christian view.

KZYM broadcasts St. Louis Cardinals and Missouri Southern State University Football, Men's and Women's Basketball Games. KZYM also airs Joplin High Football and Basketball.

External links 
FCC History Cards for KZYM

ZYM
News and talk radio stations in the United States